The Maddigans are a Canadian Pop Punk/Rock band from Edmonton, Alberta. The band are best known for their DIY touring schedule, including playing 19 countries without a booking agent. They have also released 3 EPs and one studio album.

History
The Maddigans formed in 2008 in Edmonton, Alberta, consisting of Trisha Watson on vocals, Benn Kimmis on drums and Eric Paone on guitar. All of the members had been friends since junior high school and had performed in other bands together.

The band released their debut EP Say It Loud in 2009. They later added bassist Thaddeus Lake to the band and began to tour alongside western Canadian bands such as The Kick Off, The Perfect Trend and Acres of Lions. In 2010 they released another EP "Way To Start This" and toured across Canada with Everyone Everywhere. During this tour Eric Paone left the band. Later that year the band added guitarist Seb Sanders as a replacement.

In 2011 the band toured the US for the first time and played Canadian Music Week In Toronto. This was followed by Ontario dates with Set It Off. In November that year bassist Thaddeus Lake was killed in a car accident by a drunk driver.

In 2012 the band released their EP "Love Vs Passion", their first with Sanders. It was dedicated it to their former bassist Thaddeus Lake. By this time the band had already done 8 Canadian tours and 2 US tours, covering "more kilometers than any [other] Edmonton band over the last 5 years". The release was immediately followed by their first UK tour. 
 The band would go on to tour the UK 6 times and Europe twice over the next 2 years. In 2016 they added Mike Hawman to the band as a bassist. They also released their first album "No Place Like Here", which was debuted on Alternative Press. Three songs from the release received regular airplay on Idobi Radio.

Style
Circuit Sweet described the band as having a "weighty mix of pop punk and pop rock"

Discography

Studio albums

Extended plays

Members
Current
 Trisha Watson - Lead Vocals
 Benn Kimmis - Drums
 Seb Sanders - Guitar/Backing Vocals
 Mike Hawman - Bass Guitar

Past
Thaddeus Lake - Bass Guitar
Alex Porro - Bass Guitar
Eric Paone - Lead Guitar
Kevin Vos - Bass Guitar
Michael Racioppo - Touring Bass Guitar

References
 Citations

Sources

External links
 

Musical groups established in 2008
Canadian pop punk groups
Musical groups from Edmonton
2008 establishments in Alberta